The New York City mayoral election of 1933 took place on November 7, 1933 in New York City. Incumbent Democratic Mayor John P. O'Brien, who was elected in a special election after the resignation of Mayor Jimmy Walker, faced Republican Congressman and 1929 mayoral candidate Fiorello La Guardia, and former acting mayor and President of the New York City Board of Aldermen Joseph V. McKee, who became acting mayor after Walker's resignation until the special election, and ran on the Recovery Party line.

Background

Incumbent Democratic Mayor Jimmy Walker, who was a member of Tammany Hall, won reelection in the 1929 election against Republican nominee Fiorello La Guardia. Walker resigned on September 1, 1932, following investigations into corruption by the Hofstadter Committee under the leadership of Samuel Seabury. Joseph V. McKee succeeded Walker as mayor, but his opponents successfully sued for a special election in which Tammany-backed John P. O'Brien was elected.

There were 2,324,389 registered voters in New York City in 1933, with 435,966 of them being Republicans. The Republican Party won New York City at the presidential level 3 times from the 1896 to 1924 presidential elections, but Herbert Hoover failed to win it in the 1928 and 1932 presidential elections.

Nominations

La Guardia

Seabury, whose investigations led to the resignation of Mayor Walker, declined to be a candidate for mayor as he felt that he would be accused of conducting the investigation for political ambition and instead gave his support to La Guardia after unsuccessfully attempting to have Nathan Straus Jr. enter the election. A draft movement sought to bring Al Smith into the election as the head of a coalition, but he declined to run on May 15.

The City Fusion Party was formed by Davidson following Mayor John P. O'Brien's victory in the 1932 election and grew out of William Jay Schieffelin's, former chair of the Citizens Union, Committee of One Thousand. The party was inspired by the Charter Party in Cincinnati which defeated Rudolph K. Hynicka's political machine in the 1920s. The Fusion Conference Committee, a group of reformers and Republicans was formed to select a candidate to oppose Tammany Hall in the mayoral election. The main leaders of the committee were Charles Seymour Whitman, J. Barstow Smull, Joseph M. Price, and Maurice P. Davidson. The committee sought to give its support to an independent Democrat due to the voter registration of the city being four-to-one in favor of the Democratic Party against the Republican Party.

The committee considered Raymond Ingersoll, John C. Knox, McKee, George Vincent McLaughlin, Richard Cunningham Patterson Jr., Seabury, Clarence J. Shearn, Smith, and Straus for the nomination, but all of them declined to run with Straus stating that he was afraid of increasing anti-Semitism if both the governor of New York and the mayor of New York City were Jewish. Price stated that "If it's La Guardia or bust, I prefer bust!". The committee narrowed down its nominees to La Guardia, Robert Moses, and John F. O'Ryan. The committee voted to give its nomination to Moses on July 26, without tell Seabury, who was opposed to Moses. However, Moses called Price to decline the nomination as Moses failed to gain Smith's endorsement.

Whitman, who was also the chair of the Republican mayoral nominating committee and opponent of La Guardia, suggested O'Ryan. The committee voted to give O'Ryan, a member of the United States Army and vice-chair of the City Fusion Party, the nomination and he accepted.

Seabury opposed O'Ryan stating that he was inexperienced in politics and Seabury had run against Whitman, who was O'Ryan's main supporter, in the 1916 gubernatorial election. Seabury formed another committee, with himself as the chair, with Charles Culp Burlingham, Roy W. Howard, and George Z. Medalie to include and replace the Fusion Conference Committee. W. Kingsland Macy asked for O'Ryan to withdraw the election as Seabury's opposition could lead to the fusion campaign failing and O'Ryan agreed to do so if he failed to receive a "convincing unanimity" from the Republican Mayoralty Committee. La Guardia stated that he would support O'Ryan if he received the nomination.

The Republican Mayoralty Committee met on August 3, and Whitman introduced a resolution to endorse O'Ryan, but it was filibustered by Ed Corsi, Stanley M. Isaacs, Vito Marcantonio, and Charles H. Tuttle. Seabury was offered the nomination, but he declined it. The majority of the committee initially supported O'Ryan, but a majority later supported La Guardia and O'Ryan released his supporters. La Guardia was given the nominations of the Republican and City Fusion parties after midnight on August 4. William Chadbourne served as La Guardia's campaign manager.

McKee
The City Fusion campaign sought to give its nomination to McKee, but he declined in order to focus on his banking career. McKee resigned from the New York City Board of Aldermen on May 4, 1933, and became the president of a bank.

Polling conducted by The Literary Digest showed La Guardia defeated O'Brien by four-to-one. President Franklin D. Roosevelt sent James Farley and Edward J. Flynn to convince McKee to run in the election as O'Brien was predicted to easily lose to La Guardia. Roosevelt's attempts were leaked on September 23, and La Guardia unsuccessfully appealed to McKee not to run. McKee announced that he would run for mayor on the ballot line of the Recovery Party on September 30, with Harry M. Durning as his campaign manager. However, the Recovery Party was unable to nominate a full slate of candidates due to how late McKee had entered the election.

Howard's New York World-Telegram offered its support to McKee in early 1933, but now he opposed "the present effort to boost him over the back fence".

Other nominations

Charles Solomon, a former member of the New York State Assembly, was given the Socialist Party of America's mayoral nomination on July 26, 1933. Henry Klein announced his candidacy on the Five Cent Fare ballot line on September 21. Robert Minor, the mayoral candidate of the Communist Party USA, held a protest outside of the German consulate in New York City on behalf of the people on trial for the Reichstag fire.

General election

Candidates
Fiorello La Guardia, U.S. Representative from East Harlem (Republican and City Fusion)
Joseph McKee, President of the New York Board of Aldermen and former acting Mayor (Recovery)
John P. O'Brien, incumbent Mayor (Democratic and Jefferson)

Campaign
The candidates running on La Guardia's downballot ticket were selected for ethnic and political considerations. W. Arthur Cunningham, the candidate for New York City Comptroller, was a reformer and a Catholic. Bernard S. Deutsch, the candidate for president of the Board of Aldermen, was the chair of the City Fusion Party in the Bronx and president of the American Jewish Congress. Jacob Gould Schurman Jr., the candidate for New York County District Attorney, was the son of Jacob Gould Schurman, who had served as the president of Cornell University and in United States foreign affairs. It was the first time in the history of New York City that the four highest positions had Italian, Irish, Jewish, and an WASP candidates on the same ticket.

Samuel S. Koenig, the leader of the Republican Party in Manhattan and a political machine, was defeated in the September primaries and replaced by Chase Mellen, a reformist who supported La Guardia. Three of the eight Tammany Hall district leaders lost reelection in their primaries.

Corsi, Leonard Covello, and Marcantonio were tasked by the La Guardia campaign with outreach to the Italian community. The F.H. La Guardia Club was formed and grew to almost one thousand members and the Honest Ballot Association, while officially non-partisan was led by supporters of the Fusion campaign, had 20,000 of its members march on election day to prevent voter intimidation. McKee was unable to lead a voter registration campaign as he had entered the election eight days before the deadline while La Guardia's campaign increased the total amount of registered voters from around 1,500,000 to 2,324,389. McKee outraised La Guardia by a factor of two-to-one although La Guardia raised more money than he had in the 1929 election due to people like John D. Rockefeller Jr. giving him financial support that they did not offer in his previous run. La Guardia ended the campaign with more money than he had spent unlike in his 1929 campaign.

President Roosevelt claimed to be neutral in the election causing Adolf A. Berle, a supporter of La Guardia, to accuse McKee of not supporting the New Deal. The newspapers that endorsed McKee had a combined readership of 4,137,792 while the ones that endorsed La Guardia had a combined readership of 1,370,953.

McKee wrote "A Serious Question" and had it published in Catholic World in 1915 when he was a high school teacher and it was about the moral and political reliability of young Jewish people in New York City. The article had been used against him during the 1925 election, but it was not effective and The American Hebrew later stated that McKee was given a clean bill of health by Jewish voters. Jewish people made up around twenty-five percent of voters in New York City and McKee attempted to tie himself to Herbert H. Lehman, who was Jewish. Seabury was critical of Lehman in multiple speeches, which McKee supporters accused of being due to Seabury's anti-Semitism, and La Guardia planned on disavowing Seabury's statements after unsuccessfully asking him to change his target due to Lehman's popularity among Jewish voters, but Paul Windels convinced him not to. McKee sent a telegram to La Guardia demanding that he disavow Seabury, but La Guardia refused to after Winndels told him of McKee's 1915 article which that Fusion campaign had known of since McKee announced his campaign. The telegram conversation between La Guardia and McKee and McKee's article were published in newspapers. Samuel Untermyer stated that McKee's article was a "reverberation of Hitlerism" and ended his support for McKee. McKee defended himself on the radio by stating that his words were taken out of context, but he was criticized by La Guardia and Untermyer. Jonah Wise, Henry Morgenthau Sr., Straus Jr., and Irving Lehman defended McKee and talked about his friendship and sympathy with Jewish people. Roosevelt rescinded an invitation to the White House he made to McKee, which was meant to unofficially show his support, after the anti-Semitism allegations and Smith declined to endorse any candidate after McKee reached out for one.

McKee accused La Guardia of being "a Communist at heart" and O'Brien's campaign released anti-La Guardia pamphlets entitled "No Red, No Clown Shall Rule This Town", but the Socialist Party of America accused him of being an opportunist, the Socialist Labor Party of America referred to him as an instrument of the ruling class, and the Communist Party USA stated that he was a "capable and valuable servant of finance capital" and "a dangerous foe of the American working class".

Results

La Guardia won in the election against McKee and O'Brien. La Guardia, who was the first Italian-American to be elected as mayor of New York City, gave his acceptance speech in Italian. He had the same level of support among Italian-Americans, around 80-90%, that Roosevelt received for president. La Guardia, who was Jewish, won a plurality of the Jewish vote while O'Brien and McKee's combined vote from Jews was below the 387,000 votes Roosevelt received. Charles Solomon, the Socialist nominee, received 59,846 votes which was less than the 122,565 votes received by Norman Thomas in the presidential election and the 249,887 votes that Morris Hillquit received in the previous mayoral election.

La Guardia, who had lost in all of the assembly districts in the 1929 election, placed first in all five boroughs and forty-six of the sixty-two assembly districts while O'Brien placed first in thirteen of the districts and McKee placed first in three districts. However, the Democratic Party retained control of the Board of Aldermen and the combined vote totals of McKee and O'Brien was 327,203 votes higher than La Guardia's total. La Guardia's 40.37% of the popular vote was an improvement on Hoover's results from the 1928 and 1932 presidential election when Hoover 36.71% and 26.62% of the popular vote in New York City respectively. McKee and O'Brien's combined vote total was 260,451 less votes than what Roosevelt received in the city in the 1932 election. Roosevelt received 66.32% of the popular vote in New York City in the 1932 election while O'Brien received 27.27% and McKee received 28.31%.

McKee's anti-Semitism controversy was blamed for his defeat. Flynn stated that "The damage has been done by the assertion that McKee was anti-Semitic" and Henry Moskowitz stated that the "Jewish controversy had a great deal to do with McKee's defeat. The Jews at that time were under the influence of the Hitler business and a great deal of harm was done to McKee because of the anti-Semitic articles". McKee previously did well in Jewish areas in his elections and received an average of 11.35% of the vote in the eighteen most Jewish assembly districts during the 1932 write-in campaign. McKee and O'Brien split the Democratic vote and both had support from different Democratic political machines.

Results by borough

Endorsements

See also
Mayoralty of Fiorello La Guardia

References

Notes

Works cited
 

Mayoral election
Mayoral elections in New York City
New York City mayoral
New York City mayoral
New York City mayoral election